Lake Athabasca (French: lac Athabasca; from Woods Cree:  , "[where] there are plants one after another") is in the north-west corner of Saskatchewan and the north-east corner of Alberta between 58° and 60° N in Canada. The lake is 26% in Alberta and 74% in Saskatchewan.

History

The name in the Dene language originally referred only to the large delta formed by the confluence of the Athabasca River at the southwest corner of the lake. Prior to 1789, Sir Alexander Mackenzie explored the lake. In 1791, Philip Turnor, cartographer for the Hudson’s Bay Company, wrote in his journal, "low swampy ground on the South side with a few willows growing upon it, from which the Lake in general takes its name Athapison in the Southern Cree tongue which signifies open country such as lakes with willows and grass growing about them". Peter Fidler originally recorded the name for the river in 1790 as the Great Arabuska. By 1801, the name had gained a closer spelling to the current name—Athapaskow Lake. By 1820, George Simpson referred to both the lake and the river as "Athabasca".

Geography and natural history 

Water flows northward from the lake via the Slave River and Mackenzie River systems, eventually reaching the Arctic Ocean.

Fort Chipewyan, one of the oldest European settlements in Alberta, is on the western shore of the lake, where the Rivière des Rochers drains the lake and flows toward Slave River, beginning its northward journey along the eastern boundary of Wood Buffalo National Park. The eastern section of the lake narrows to a width of about 1 km (.6 miles) near the community of Fond du Lac on the northern shore then continues to its most easterly point at the mouth of the Fond du Lac River.

Fidler Point on the north shore of Lake Athabasca is named for Peter Fidler, a surveyor and map maker for the Hudson's Bay Company.

Along with other lakes such as the Great Bear Lake and Great Slave Lake, Lake Athabasca is a remnant of the vast Glacial Lake McConnell.

Tributaries 
Tributaries of Lake Athabasca include (going clockwise); Fond du Lac River, Otherside River, Helmer Creek, MacFarlane River, Archibald River, William River, Ennuyeuse Creek, Dumville Creek, Debussac Creek, Jackfish Creek, Claussen Creek, Old Fort River, Crown Creek, Athabasca River, Colin River, Oldman River, Bulyea River, Grease River and  Robillard River.

Development and environment
Uranium and gold mining along the northern shore resulted in the birth of Uranium City, Saskatchewan, which was home to mine workers and their families. While the last mine closed in the 1980s, the effects of mining operations had already heavily contaminated the northern shores. The large oil sands mining nearby is suspected to have added to the current pollution levels in the lake.

On October31, 2013, one of Obed Mountain coal mine's pits failed, and from between 600 million to a billion liters of slurry poured into the Plante and Apetowun Creeks.

The Lake Athabasca Sand Dunes, the largest active sand dunes in the world north of 58°, are adjacent to the southern shore. The dunes were designated a "Provincial Wilderness Park" in 1992.

Lake Athabasca contains 23 species of fish, with a world record lake trout of  caught from its depths in 1961 by means of a gillnet.
Other fish species include walleye, yellow perch, northern pike, goldeye, lake whitefish, cisco, Arctic grayling, burbot, white sucker and longnose sucker.

See also
List of lakes of Saskatchewan
List of place names in Canada of Indigenous origin
 Peace–Athabasca Delta

References

External links

Lake Athabasca and associated Sand Dunes
International Lake Environment Committee, June 21, 2001
Fish Species of Saskatchewan
Encyclopedia of Saskatchewan (Lake Athabasca)
Athabasca Sand Dunes Provincial Park

 
Lakes of Saskatchewan
Lakes of Alberta
Hudson's Bay Company trading posts
Borders of Alberta
Borders of Saskatchewan
Regional Municipality of Wood Buffalo